Boldo is an unincorporated community in Walker County, Alabama, United States.

History
Boldo was named after a proud young deer or "bold doe" as noted by Willie Barton in her book about the history of Boldo called "Tracks of a Bold Doe". A post office operated under the name Boldo from 1878 to 1904. Boldo was formerly home to Boldo School, which served as a location for teaching vocational agriculture as outlined in the Smith–Hughes Act. Around 1876 Leroy Williams build a Mill on Blackwater Creek, known as Williams Mill. In 1903, the Boldo Grist Mill served as a flour and grist mill for people of the surrounding area.

Schools
Boldo Junior High School (1908-1981) "Bulldogs"

Local attractions
Dixie Saddle Club - 
Boldo Lions Club

Notes

Unincorporated communities in Walker County, Alabama
Unincorporated communities in Alabama